The Royal Norwegian Ministry of Petroleum and Energy is a Norwegian ministry responsible for energy, including petroleum and natural gas production in the North Sea. It is led by Minister of Petroleum and Energy Terje Aasland (Labour Party). The department must report to the legislature, the Storting.

Organisation
The ministry is divided into the following sections:
Political staff
Communication Unit
Technology and Industry Department
Energy and Water Resources Department
Department of Trade and Industrial Economics
Administration, Budgets and Accounting Department

Political staff 
 Minister Marte Mjøs Persen (Labor Party)

Subsidiaries
Subordinate government agencies:
 Norwegian Petroleum Directorate
 Norwegian Water Resources and Energy Directorate
 Enova
 Gassnova
 Statnett

Wholly owned limited companies:
 Gassco
 Petoro

Partially owned public limited companies:
 Equinor (62% ownership)

References

External links

Official web site

 
Petroleum and Energy
Norway
Ministry of Petroleum and Energy
Ministry of Petroleum and Energy
Ministry of Petroleum and Energy
Petroleum politics
1978 establishments in Norway
Norway, Petroleum and Energy